Limnonectes sisikdagu is a species of fanged frogs in the family Dicroglossidae. It is endemic to West Sumatra, Indonesia, where its holotype was found near Solok. It is part of the Limnonectes kuhlii species complex.

References

 McLeod, Horner, Husted, Barley & Iskandar, 2011 : "Same-same, but different": an unusual new species of the Limnonectes kuhlii complex from west Sumatra (Anura: Dicroglossidae). Zootaxa, .
http://research.amnh.org/vz/herpetology/amphibia/Amphibia/Anura/Dicroglossidae/Dicroglossinae/Limnonectes/Limnonectes-sisikdagu

Amphibians described in 2011
Amphibians of Indonesia
sisikdagu